Koodiyattam (IAST: kūṭiyāṭṭaṁ) is a traditional performing art form in the state of Kerala, India. It is a combination of ancient Sanskrit theatre with elements of Koothu, an ancient performing art from the Sangam era. It is officially recognised by UNESCO as a Masterpiece of the Oral and Intangible Heritage of Humanity.

Origin

Koodiyattam, meaning "combined acting" in Malayalam, combines Sanskrit theatre performance with elements of traditional koothu. It is traditionally performed in temple theatres known as koothambalams. It is the only surviving art form that uses drama from ancient Sanskrit theatre. It has a documented history of a thousand years in Kerala, but its origins are not known. Koodiyattam and Chakyar koothu were among the dramatized dance worship services in the temples of ancient India, particularly Kerala. Both koodiyattam and Chakyar koothu originated from the ancient art form koothu, which is mentioned several times in Sangam literature, and the epigraphs of the subsequent Pallava, Pandiyan, Chera, and Chola periods. Inscriptions related to koothu can be seen in temples at Tanjore, Tiruvidaimaruthur, Vedaranyam, Tiruvarur, and Omampuliyur. They were treated as an integral part of worship services, alongside the singing of Tevaram and Prabandam hymns.

Ancient kings are among those listed as authors of works for these services. There is evidence of these across the ancient subcontinent during the Chola and Pallava periods. A Pallava king called Rajasimha has been credited with authoring the play Kailasodharanam in Tamil, which has the topic of Ravana becoming subject to Siva's anger and being subdued mercilessly for this.

It is believed that Kulasekhara Varma, a medieval king of the Chera Perumal dynasty, reformed koodiyattam, introducing the local language for Vidusaka and structuring the presentation of the play into well-defined units. He himself wrote two plays, Subhadradhananjayam and Tapatisamvarana and made arrangements for their presentation on stage with the help of a Brahmin friend (Thozhan). These plays are still performed. Apart from these, the plays traditionally presented include Ascaryacudamani of Saktibhadra, Kalyanasaugandhika of Nilakantha, Bhagavadajjuka of Bodhayana, Nagananda of Harsa, and many plays ascribed to Bhasa, including Abhiseka and Pratima.

Instruments 

Traditionally, the main musical instruments used in koodiyattam are the mizhavu, kuzhitalam, edakka, kurumkuzhal, and sankhu. The mizhavu, the most prominent of these, is a percussion instrument that is played by a person of the Ambalavas Nambiar caste, accompanied by Nangyaramma playing the kuzhithalam (a type of cymbal).

Performance style 

Traditionally, koodiyattam has been performed by Chakyars (a subcaste of Kerala Hindus) and by Nangyaramma (women of the Ambalavasi Nambiar caste). The name "koodiyattam", meaning playing or performing together, is thought to refer to the presence of multiple actors on stage who act in rhythm with the beats of the mizhavu drummers. Alternatively, it may also be a reference to a common practice in Sanskrit drama where a single actor who has performed solo for several nights is joined by another.

The main actor is a Chakyar who performs the ritualistic koothu and koodiyattam inside the temple or in the koothambalam. Chakyar women, Illotammas, are not allowed to participate. Instead, the female roles are played by Nangyaramma. Koodiyattam performances are often lengthy and elaborate, ranging from 12 to 150 hours spread across several nights. A complete Koodiyattam performance consists of three parts. The first of these is the purappadu where an actor performs a verse along with the nritta aspect of dance. Following this is the nirvahanam where the actor, using abhinaya, presents the mood of the main character of the play. Then there is the nirvahanam, a retrospective, which takes the audience up to the point where the actual play begins. The final part of the performance is the koodiyattam, which is the play itself. While the first two parts are solo acts, koodiyattam can have as many characters as are required to perform on the stage.

The elders of the Chakyar community traditionally taught the artform to their youngsters. It was performed only by Chakyars until the 1950s. In 1955, Guru Mani Madhava Chakyar performed Kutiyattam outside the temple for the first time, for which he faced many problems from the hardline Chakyar community. In his own words:

In 1962, under the leadership of art and Sanskrit scholar V. Raghavan, Sanskrit Ranga of Madras invited Guru Mani Madhava Chakyar to perform koodiyattam in Chennai. Thus for the first time in history koodiyattam was performed outside Kerala. They presented over three nights koodiyattam scenes from the plays Abhiṣeka, Subhadrādhanañjaya and Nāgānda.

In early 1960s Maria Christoffer Byrski, a Polish student doing research in Indian theatres at Banaras Hindu University, studied koodiyattam with Mani Madhava Chakyar and became the first non-Chakyar/nambiar to learn the art form. He stayed in Guru's home at Killikkurussimangalam and studied in the traditional Gurukula way.

Noted artists

Mani Madhava Chakyar
Ammannur Madhava Chakyar, who in the 1980s became one of the first koodiyattam performers to present this art to an international audience.
Moozhikkulam Kochukuttan Chakyar, who in 1981 became the first Residential Guru at Margi, an institution promoting traditional art forms of Kerala. He was a cousin of Ammannur Madhava Chakyar.
Mani Damodara Chakyar, who is Mani Madhava Chakkiar's disciple and nephew, is also a performer of traditional devotional koodiyattams.

Decline 
Koodiyattam traditionally was an exclusive art form performed in special venues called koothambalams in Hindu temples and access to these performances was restricted to only caste Hindus. Also, performances can take up to forty days to complete. The collapse of the feudal order in the nineteenth century in Kerala curtailed the patronage of koodiyattam artists, and they faced serious financial difficulties. Following a revival in the early twentieth century, Koodiyattam is once again facing a lack of funding, leading to a crisis in the profession. UNESCO has called for the creation of a network of koodiyattam institutions and gurukalams to promote the transmission of the art form to future generations and for the development of new audiences besides fostering greater academic research in it. Natanakairali in Irinjalakuda is one of the most prominent institutions in the field of koodiyattam revival. The Margi Theatre Group in Thiruvananthapuram is another organisation dedicated to the revival of kathakali and koodiyattom in Kerala. Also, Nepathya is an institution promoting koodiyattam and related art forms at Moozhikkulam. The Sangeet Natak Akademi, India's National Academy for Music, Dance and Drama, has awarded the Sangeet Natak Akademi Award, the highest award for performing artists, to kutiyattam artists like Kalamandalam Sivan Namboodiri (2007), Painkulam Raman Chakyar (2010) and Painkulam Damodara Chakyar (2012).

See also

 Margi Sathi
 Arts of Kerala
 Mohiniyattam
 Thulall
 Parayan Thullal
 Moozhikkulam Kochukuttan Chakyar

References

Further reading

Natyakalpadruma (1975), a Kerala Sahitya Academy Award-winning book on Koodiyattam written by Guru Mani Madhava Chakyar, considered authoritative by scholars.
The Nātya Shāstra, an ancient work of dramatic theory where Bharata Muni describes the Sanskrit theatre of the Gupta Empire; Koodiyattam is believed to preserve some aspects of the performance style of that period.
Abhinaya Darpana by Nandikeshvara, another work of dramatic theory comparable to the Nātya Shāstra.
 Farley Richmond, Kutiyattam: Sanskrit Theater of India (University of Michigan Press, 2002). CD-ROM featuring videos and text.
 Rajendran C, "The Traditional Sanskrit Theatre of Kerala" (University of Calicut,1989)
Virginie Johan, "Kuttu-Kutiyattam : théâtres classiques du Kerala". Revue d’histoire du théâtre 216, 2002-4: 365–382.
Virginie Johan, "Pour un théâtre des yeux : l’exemple indien". Coulisses 33, 2006 : 259–274.

External links

 Wikiquote:Guru Mani Madhava Chakyar/Kutiyattam
 Kudiyattam: A Multi-Disciplinary Approach to the Living Sanskrit Theater of Kerala
 

 
Performing arts in India
Dances of Kerala
Theatre in India
Masterpieces of the Oral and Intangible Heritage of Humanity
Arts of Kerala
Religious vernacular drama
Cultural heritage of India